Zalian (also Romanized as Zālīān, Zāleyān, and Zālīyān) is a village in Zalian Rural District, Zalian District, Shazand County, Markazi Province, Iran. At the 2006 census, its population was 580, in 137 families.

References 

Populated places in Shazand County